AFCB may refer to:
AFC Bournemouth, an English football club
American Fuel Cell Bus, a zero-emission transit bus based on the ENC Axess with a hydrogen fuel cell and electric traction motor
Armed Forces Chaplains Board, a U.S. Department of Defense organization of military Chiefs and Deputy Chiefs of Chaplains